Saint-Nazaire-de-Valentane is a commune in the Tarn-et-Garonne département in the Occitanie region in southern France.

Geography
The Barguelonne forms all of the commune's southeastern border.

See also
Communes of the Tarn-et-Garonne department

References

Communes of Tarn-et-Garonne